United Nations Security Council Resolution 1968, adopted unanimously on February 16, 2011, after recalling previous resolutions on the situation in Côte d'Ivoire (Ivory Coast), including resolutions 1933 (2010), 1942 (2010), 1946 (2010), 1951 (2010), 1962 (2010) and 1967 (2011), the Council extended the deployment of troops from the United Nations Mission in Liberia (UNMIL) to the United Nations Operation in Côte d'Ivoire (UNOCI) for an additional three months.

The Council recalled inter-mission co-operation agreements outlined in resolutions 1609 (2005) and 1938 (2010). At the same time, it also reiterated that it could authorise the Secretary-General Ban Ki-moon to send additional troops if necessary.

Acting under Chapter VII of the United Nations Charter, the Council authorised the temporary redeployment from UNMIL to UNOCI of three infantry companies, one aviation unit and five helicopters for a further three months.  It also urged support from police and troop-contributing countries in that regard.

The resolution was adopted amid the political crisis in Côte d'Ivoire, with Laurent Gbagbo and Alassane Ouattara both being inaugurated as President.

See also
 2010–2011 Ivorian crisis
 Ivorian Civil War
 Ivorian parliamentary election, 2011
 Ivorian presidential election, 2010
 List of United Nations Security Council Resolutions 1901 to 2000 (2009–2011)

References

External links
 
Text of the Resolution at undocs.org

 1968
2011 in Ivory Coast
 1968
February 2011 events